The Night of Hunters Tour was the eleventh world concert tour by American singer-songwriter Tori Amos in support of her twelfth studio album Night of Hunters. During the tour Amos was supported by the Apollon Musagète Quartett, making this her first tour with a string quartet. As well as playing select songs from Night of Hunters, Amos played various songs from her back catalogue rearranged by her longtime collaborator, John Philip Shenale, to accommodate the string quartet.

Amos was accompanied by the string quartet on every leg of the tour except in South Africa, where she performed solo with her Bösendorfer piano.

Songs
Amos is known for changing her setlist every time she performs. The following songs were performed more than 40% of the time.

 Baker Baker
 Big Wheel
 Carry
 Cloud on my Tongue
 Cruel
 Fearlessness
 Girl Disappearing
 Leather
 Mr. Zebra
 Nautical Twilight
 Precious Things
 Shattering Sea
 Siren
 Snow Cherries from France
 Spark
 Star Whisperer
 Suede
 Way Down
 Winter
 Your Ghost

Tour dates

References

2011 concert tours
Tori Amos concert tours